Transcendental Étude No. 12 in B minor is an étude for piano written by composer Franz Liszt. It has the programmatic title "Chasse-neige" ("snow-whirls"), and is the 12th and last of the Transcendental Études. The étude is a study in tremolos but contains many other difficulties like wide jumps and fast chromatic scales, and it requires a very gentle and soft touch in the beginning.  The piece gradually builds up to a powerful climax.  It is one of the most difficult Transcendental Études, being ranked 9 out of 9 by publisher G. Henle Verlag—one of the six in the series to receive the highest possible difficulty ranking.

Ferruccio Busoni stated the étude was the "noblest example, perhaps, amongst all music of a poetising nature." He described the work as "a sublime and steady fall of snow which gradually buries landscape and people".

References

External links 
 

Transcendental 12
Compositions in B-flat minor
1852 compositions